Wang Linlin is a Chinese football player who plays as a defender for Shanghai Shengli. Wang Linlin scored equaliser in the 76th minute against South Korea in the 2022 East Asia Championship, which was her first national team goal.

Career

Club career
Wang Linlin played for Shanghai Women Football Club.

Her sister Wang Siqian also played for the same club.

International career
Wang Linlin represented China in 2019 AFC U-19 Women's Championship in 2019.

International goals

References

2000 births
Living people
Chinese women's footballers
China women's international footballers
Footballers from Shanghai
Women's association football defenders